= DigiPivot =

Skiing programme for women

DigiPivOt
- Founder: Google India
- Launched: March 2020; 6 years ago

DigiPivot is a skilling programme designed for women. It was launched by Google India.

== Opportunities ==
DigiPivot aims at equipping individuals with skills to excel in digital marketing and related fields. Some of the career opportunities are.

- Digital Marketing Specialist.
- Content Strategist.
- Social Media Manager.
- SEO Analyst/Consultant.
- Data Analyst.
- E-commerce Manager.
- Email Marketing Specialist.
